John J. McCue (May 14, 1875 – June 2, 1935) served a single term as mayor of Boise, Idaho, from 1933 to 1935.

References

External links 
Mayors of Boise - Past and Present
Idaho State Historical Society Reference Series, Corrected List of Mayors, 1867-1996

Mayors of Boise, Idaho
1875 births
1935 deaths